William Sodd (September 18, 1914 – May 14, 1998) was a Major League Baseball player who played for one season. He appeared in one game as a pinch hitter for the Cleveland Indians on September 27 during the 1937 Cleveland Indians season.

External links

1914 births
1998 deaths
Baseball players from Texas
Cleveland Indians players
Texas A&M Aggies baseball players